The Khải Định Thông Bảo (Hán tự: 啓定通寳) was a French Indochinese sapèque coin produced from 1921 until 1933, the design of the coin was round with a square hole that was used for stringing them together. Khải Định became King of Annam in 1916 the funding for the production of new cash coins was reduced by the Hanoi Mint which lead to the demand of the Vietnamese market for low value denominations to not be met, furthermore, after Hanoi reduced funding for the Thanh Hóa Mint, which until that time was producing enough low denomination cast cash coins to meet the market's demands, which caused most, but not all, of the production of cash coins at the mint to cease in 1920. In response a new committee was formed in Hanoi which ordered the creation of machine-struck Khải Định Thông Bảo cash coins, these are the first machine-struck four character Thông Bảo (通寳) coins in Vietnam with the reigning emperor's name as the French government had prior tried to introduce a Cochinchinese 2 sapèque coin that continued under French Indochina that weighed 2.05 grams and had a nominal value of  piastre, later the colonial government of the French Protectorate of Tonkin had unsuccessfully tried to introduce a zinc milled sapèque produced by the Paris Mint with a nominal value of  piastre from 1905 until 1906. Unlike the earlier attempts at producing machine-struck cash coins by the colonial French authorities the Khải Định Thông Bảo proved to be much more successful as the first series had a production of 27,629,000 coins while the second series greatly exceeded this with around 200,000,000 coins produced in Huế, Haiphong, and Hanoi. The Khải Định Thông Bảo continued to be produced long after the death of Emperor Khải Định under his successor Bảo Đại until it was phased out by the Bảo Đại Thông Bảo (保大通寳) in 1933.

In the French protectorate of Annam cash coins were still being used for virtually all transactions as late as 1921, in order to combat deflation the Khải Định Thông Bảo was introduced and mass-produced. The new machine-struck were produced in the French protectorate of Tonkin to be placed into the treasury of the government of the Nguyễn dynasty until an opportune moment would present itself to introduce them into general circulation to combat the negative effects of hoarding, which resulted in the gradual disappearance of older cash coins from circulation causing the low denomination copper-alloy coins to become scarce. The new Khải Định Thông Bảo cash coins were introduced with a hope to reduce the cost of living caused by delfation. 

The French government in Annam announced in their official bulletin that they would exchange 1 Khải Định Thông Bảo cash coin for 6 old cash coins in order to promote their circulation. 

Because the machine-struck Khải Định Thông Bảo cash coins were heavier than the earlier milled 2 sapèques produced by the Paris Mint, they were likely valued at  piastre. A number of the machine-struck cash coins were produced by Poinsard & Veyret Comptoirs D’Extrême-Orient in Hải Phòng, French Tonkin. While the Hanoi-made coins were struck by the Banque de l'Indochine.

In Tonkin these coins were welcomed and circulated with small denomination coins of the French Indochinese piastre, while in Annam the people were more reluctant to adopt the new machine-struck coinage.

Other coins  

The inscription "Khải Định Thông Bảo" was also used for non-cash coins produced under the reign of Emperor Khải Định for tiền (錢) and lạng (兩) coins made from silver and gold, respectively. Although more commonly the inscription Khải Định Niên Tạo (啓定年造) was used for silver ingots (sycees).

See also 

 Cash (Chinese coin)
 Tự Đức Thông Bảo
 Tự Đức Bảo Sao

Notes

References

Sources 
 Howard A. Daniel, III (3rd edition, 2018) The Catalog and Guidebook of Southeast Asian Coins and Currency. Volume I: France.

External link

 
 

 

Currencies of Vietnam
Modern obsolete currencies
Economic history of Vietnam
Cash coins by inscription